Al-Buzuriyah Souq is a historical souk located to the south of the Umayyad Mosque inside the old walled city of Damascus, Syria. The souk is famous for its spices vendors, and the many historical khans located along it, including Khan As'ad Pasha. On its southern end it meets Medhat Pasha Souq.

Perfumes and spices are sold on the market, as well as various types of sweets, products, dried fruit and soap (olive oil soap and the famous Syrian laurel soap).

Gallery

See also
 
Al-Hamidiyah Souq
Bazaar
Bazaari 
Market (place)
Medhat Pasha Souq
Retail
Souq 

Buzuriyah

References